The Dickens County Courthouse and Jail, on Public Sq. in Dickens, Texas, was built in 1892. It was listed on the National Register of Historic Places in 1980.

It is a Texas State Antiquities Landmark and a Recorded Texas Historic Landmark.

It formerly had a polygonal central tower with a domed cupola.

See also

National Register of Historic Places listings in Dickens County, Texas
Recorded Texas Historic Landmarks in Dickens County
List of county courthouses in Texas

References

Courthouses in Texas
Courthouses on the National Register of Historic Places in Texas
National Register of Historic Places in Dickens County, Texas
Government buildings completed in 1892
Texas State Antiquities Landmarks
Recorded Texas Historic Landmarks